Phaseolus ritensis is a plant species native to Arizona, Sonora, Chihuahua, Sinaloa and Nuevo León. Common names include "Santa Rita Mountain bean" (in US) and "cocolmeca" in Mexico. It grows in forested areas in the mountains.

Phaseolus ritensis is a perennial herb with a large woody taproot. It is a trailing herb with trifoliate leaves and pink to lavender flowers.

Uses
The plant is widely valued for both food and medicine throughout much of its native range. Green and ripe fruits served as an important food source in times past. Roots are the source of medicine, glue, and a fermenting agent.

References

ritensis
Flora of Mexico
Flora of Arizona
Flora of Sonora
Flora of Chihuahua (state)
Flora of Sinaloa
Flora of Nuevo León
Medicinal plants